Parivar  is a 1967 Indian Hindi-language drama film, produced and directed by Kewal P Kashyap on K.P.K. Movies banner. It stars Jeetendra and Nanda, with music composed by Kalyanji–Anandji.

Plot 
Gopal (Jeetendra) a medico falls in love with a girl Meena (Nanda) on a bus journey. Gopal lives with his father Karamchand (Om Prakash), the only breadwinner of a huge family. Since Gopal is a stepson to his virago wife Bhagwanti (Sulochana Latkar), she scorns and evicts him. Time passes, Gopal becomes a doctor, couples up with Meena, and is blessed with 3 children. Besides, Karamchand goes indebted as he is unable to sustain the family. Moreover, his lecherous friend Diwanchand Rai (Krishan Dhawan) lusts for one of his daughters Sapna (Madhavi). Knowing it, Gopal revolts which Bhagwanti discredits and conversely libels him. As a result, Sapna becomes pregnant and kills herself when Bhagawanti realizes her mistake. Then, fuming Karamchand slaughters Diwanchand when Gopal self-implicates, to rescue his father. At the last minute, Karamchand confesses his guilty and leaves his last breath. At last, Gopal honors his father's responsibilities. Finally, the movie ends with Meena aiding Gopal at work.

Cast 

Jeetendra as Gopal
Nanda as Meena
Rajendra Nath as Sitaram
Om Prakash as Karamchand
Sulochana Chatterjee as Bhagwanti
Jagdish Raj
Sumati Gupte as Leela
Manmohan as Bashir, Bengali Taxi Driver
Sunder as Doctor
Gulshan Bawra as Shambhu
Mehmood Jr. as Young Sitaram
Krishan Dhawan as Diwanchand Rai
Jankidas as Paanwala
Sarita Joshi as Amba (Special Appearance)
Randhir
Tun Tun
Raj Kishore

Soundtrack 
The music was composed by Kalyanji–Anandji.

References

External links 
 

1960s Hindi-language films
1967 drama films
1967 films
Films scored by Kalyanji Anandji